"Not Pretty Enough" is a song by Australian country singer-songwriter Kasey Chambers, produced by her brother Nash Chambers for her second studio album, Barricades & Brickwalls (2001). It was released as the album's third single on 14 January 2002 in Australia as a CD single. It became a number-one hit in Australia the same year, and it also found success in New Zealand, where it reached number four. In the United States, it was serviced to adult album alternative radio in late January 2002.

The song was written by Chambers as a commentary on the reluctance of commercial radio stations towards playing her music, despite her being an established performer. However, the single prompted Chambers' commercial breakthrough and was most-added song to radio station playlists in 2002.

Reception
In 2017, the song was selected for the National Film and Sound Archive's Sounds of Australia collection of historically and culturally important recordings.

Junkee said, "2009's The Loved Ones, a horror film about an obsessed stalker, put Kasey Chambers' hit in the mouth of its villain. But it wasn't subverting the song; it was just making the subtext into text. "Not Pretty Enough" is a ballad about over-stepping boundaries and weaponising self-hatred. The creepiness is already there. It’s a gloriously uncomfortable tilt into the painful things about love."

Track listing

Charts

Weekly charts

Year-end charts

Decade-end charts

Certifications

Release history

References

2001 songs
2002 singles
APRA Award winners
EMI Records singles
Kasey Chambers songs
Number-one singles in Australia
Songs written by Kasey Chambers
Warner Records singles